Princess Nathalie of Sayn-Wittgenstein-Berleburg (Nathalie Xenia Margrethe Benedikte; born 2 May 1975) is a Danish equestrian, an Olympian and a daughter of Princess Benedikte of Denmark and Prince Richard of Sayn-Wittgenstein-Berleburg. She is the niece of Queen Margrethe II of Denmark and King Constantine II of Greece.

A member of the Danish dressage team, she won bronze at the 2008 Summer Olympics, and also participated in the 2012 Summer Olympics. She has been the coach of the Danish national dressage team since 2017.

Early life
Princess Nathalie was born on 2 May 1975 in Copenhagen, Denmark, as the youngest of the three children of Princess Benedikte of Denmark and Prince Richard of Sayn-Wittgenstein-Berleburg. She grew up at Schloss Berleburg in Bad Berleburg in Germany.

Nathalie and her sister Alexandra became Danish citizens on 19 May 1998. Neither she nor her siblings are in line of succession to the Danish throne as that would have required taking up permanent residence in Denmark when reaching the age of mandatory education.

Equestrian career
In 1994, Princess Nathalie began training on the Swedish stud Flyinge with her trainer Kyra Kyrklund, former world champion in dressage. After four years, during which she won the bronze medal at the European Championship with the Danish team, she had to change coaches as Kyrklund moved to England. She teamed up with Klaus Balkenhol, coach of the German dressage team.

Nathalie gained a place in the 2000 Olympic team as reserve rider, and afterward participated in the European Championship of 2001, winning a bronze medal and the World Championship 2002 (where she was placed fourth) with the Danish team. She was a member of the Danish dressage team in the 2008 Summer Olympics and was awarded a bronze medal.

She was part of the Danish equestrian team in the London 2012 Olympics, competing in the team and individual dressage events on her horse Digby. She finished 12th in the individual event and helped Denmark to a 4th place team finish.

In January 2017, Nathalie was named head coach of the Danish national dressage team. She left the position in 2021 but has since continued to coach national team riders Cathrine Laudrup-Dufour and Daniel Bachmann Andersen privately.

In addition to riding, she also breeds horses like her mother. In autumn 2005, she opened her own stud farm which is based in Bad Berleburg.

Marriage and children
On 4 January 2010, Princess Nathalie's engagement to German horse breeder Alexander Johannsmann (born 6 December 1977), son of showjumper Heinrich-Wilhelm Johannsmann, was announced. The couple married civilly 27 May 2010 and religiously the following year, on 18 June 2011 at the Protestant Stadtkirche in Berleburg, Germany.

Princess Nathalie gave birth to a son, Konstantin Gustav Heinrich Richard, on 24 July 2010. He was named Konstantin for his maternal grandfather, whose middle name is Konstantin, as well as for his maternal grand-uncle, King Constantine II of Greece; Gustav for his maternal uncle and godfather; Heinrich for his paternal grandfather; and Richard for his maternal grandfather. Konstantin's godparents were Crown Princess Mary of Denmark, his aunt Ann-Kathrin Johannsmann, and his uncle Prince Gustav. On 28 January 2015, she gave birth to her second child, a daughter named Louisa Margareta Benedikte Hanna, in Bad Berleburg, Germany.

On 15 August 2022, the Danish court confirmed that Nathalie and Johannsmann had divorced.

Honours and awards

Honours
 : Recipient of the 50th Birthday Badge Medal of King Carl XVI Gustaf

Awards

  International Olympic Committee: Bronze Medal for Team dressage of the 2008 Beijing Olympics
  International Olympic Committee: Bronze Medal of the Dressage World Cup

Ancestry

References

1975 births
Living people
Nobility from Copenhagen
German princesses
Danish dressage riders
Danish female equestrians
Royal Olympic medalists
Olympic equestrians of Denmark
Equestrians at the 2008 Summer Olympics
Olympic bronze medalists for Denmark
House of Sayn-Wittgenstein
Olympic medalists in equestrian
Equestrians at the 2012 Summer Olympics
Medalists at the 2008 Summer Olympics